Hengst is a German surname. Notable people with the name include:

 Claudia Hengst (1969), former German paralympic athlete
 Sandra Hengst (1973), German women's international footballer
 Stefan Hengst (1994), German slalom canoeist

See also
 Hengst (disambiguation)

Surnames from nicknames